Stefan Milošević (born 7 April 1995) is a Serbian footballer who plays as a left-back for Spartak Subotica.

Club career

Early years
Born in Požarevac, Milošević grew up in Kostolac, where he has started playing football with local club Rudar. Later, when he was 11, Milošević joined Red Star Belgrade, and after 4 years moved in Partizan, where he completed his youth career.

Spartak Subotica
Milošević joined Spartak Subotica for the 2013–14 season. He made his senior debut in first fixture of the Serbian SuperLiga, played on 10 August 2013. During the season, Milošević made 15 league appearances with 14 starts and 2 semi-final cup matches against Vojvodina. Milošević also spent the 2014–15 season as the first choice on the left-back position, making 26 league and 1 cup appearance. After winning 2015 FIFA U-20 World Cup, Milošević changed his jersey number and took 11 at the beginning of 2015–16 season. Coach Stevan Mojsilović moved Milošević on wing position, more offensive, but later after Nebojša Mezei injured, Milošević returned in defense. Milošević scored 1 goal for the first half-season under Mojsilović, and later, in the spring half-season, he scored 4 more goals under coach Andrey Chernyshov. For the 2015–16 season, Milošević made 30 league and 4 cup appearances, scoring 5 goals and 2 assists. After the end of season, and one year before the end of contract with Spartak Subotica, he made deal with Red Star Belgrade.

Red Star Belgrade
Stefan Milošević signed a four-year contract with new club on 3 May 2016, and he was given number 21 jersey. He noted his first official cap for new team in the Serbian Cup match against BSK Borča, played on 26 October 2016. He missed the whole period until 5 April 2017, when he also played in a cup match against Mladost Lučani. Several days later, he made his league debur for the club in 29 fixture match of the 2016–17 season, against Rad, replacing Nemanja Milić at the beginning of second-half. Milošević started his first match on the field for Red Star Belgrade in last fixture match of the regular season, against Borac Čačak. After summer pre-season, Milošević stayed out of the first squad for the 2017–18 campaign, and spent the rest of 2017 without competitive matches. On 8 February, it was officially announced both sides mutually terminated the contract and Milošević left the club as a free agent.

Return to Spartak Subotica
In the winter-break of the 2017–18 Serbian SuperLiga campaign, Milošević moved back to Spartak Subotica. He officially promoted on 24 February 2018, penning two-and-a-half year deal with the club. He made his first appearance in the 2017–18 Serbian SuperLiga season in 4–3 away defeat against Napredak Kruševac.

Career statistics

Club

Honours

International
Serbia
 FIFA U-20 World Cup: 2015

References

External links
 Stefan Milošević Stats at utakmica.rs 
 
 
 
 
 

1995 births
Living people
Sportspeople from Požarevac
Association football defenders
Serbian footballers
Serbia youth international footballers
FK Spartak Subotica players
Red Star Belgrade footballers
Serbian SuperLiga players